San Gerónimo Airport is an airstrip serving Algarrobo, a Pacific coastal city in the Valparaíso Region of Chile.

The runway parallels an east–west road atop a low ridge. There are ravines to the north and south of the runway. Another road intersects the runway at a shallow angle, giving the runway the visual appearance of being bent.

See also

Transport in Chile
List of airports in Chile

References

External links
OpenStreetMap - San Gerónimo
OurAirports - San Gerónimo
FallingRain - San Gerónimo Airport

Airports in Chile
Airports in Valparaíso Region